The 2006 Budweiser Shootout was the first exhibition stock car race of the 2006 NASCAR Nextel Cup Series season, and the 28th iteration of the event. The race was postponed to Sunday, February 12, 2006 from the originally scheduled date of February 11 due to rain. The race was held in Daytona Beach, Florida, at Daytona International Speedway, a 2.5 miles (4.0 km) permanent triangular-shaped superspeedway, before a crowd of 60,000. The race was extended from 70 laps to 72 due to a green–white–checker finish. At race's end, rookie Denny Hamlin, driving for Joe Gibbs Racing would pass teammate Tony Stewart on the final restart and hold off the field to pull off a stunning victory in the shootout, the first Budweiser Shootout win of his career. To fill out the podium, Dale Earnhardt Jr. of Dale Earnhardt, Inc. and Tony Stewart of Joe Gibbs Racing would finish second and third, respectively.

Background

Format and eligibility 
The race was broken up into two segments: a 20-lap segment, followed by a ten-minute intermission, concluding with a 50-lap second segment. While a pit stop was no longer required by rule, a reduction in fuel cell size (from 22 gallons to 13.5 gallons) made a fuel stop necessary. (In 2007, fuel cells were expanded to 18.5 gallons.) Many drivers also changed two tires during their fuel stop, as the time required to fuel the car allowed for a two-tire change without additional delay.

Pole winners of the previous season were automatically eligible for the race. Then, previous winners who had not already qualified would receive automatic births.

Entry list 

*Withdrew, according to crew chief Philippe Lopez.

Starting lineup 
The starting lineup was determined by a blind draw. Ken Schrader of Wood Brothers/JTG Racing would draw the pole.

*Withdrew.

Race

Segment 1 
Pole sitter Ken Schrader led the first lap of the race. With 8 laps to go in segment 1, Jimmie Johnson took the lead from Schrader. On that same lap in turn 3, Carl Edwards went below the yellow line to avoid Kasey Kahne coming down into him. With 6 laps to go in segment 1, Schrader took the lead back from Johnson. On the same lap, the big one struck on the backstretch taking out 9 cars. It started when Jamie McMurray got hooked by Brian Vickers and McMurray turned down into Ryan Newman. The wreck collected Ryan Newman, Jamie McMurray, Brian Vickers, Kyle Busch, Mark Martin, Dale Earnhardt Jr., Kasey Kahne, Scott Riggs, and Dale Jarrett. Segment 1 ended under caution and Ken Schrader won the segment. After going below the line with 8 to go in segment 1, Carl Edwards was penalized by NASCAR and was sent to the rear of the field for the restart.

Rest of race 
The race restarted on lap 21 and Jimmie Johnson took the lead from Schrader. On lap 23, the second caution flew when Jeff Gordon's car began smoking from the rear. The race restarted on lap 29 with Jimmie Johnson remaining as the leader. On lap 32, Kyle Busch took the lead from Johnson. On lap 35, Michael Waltrip took the lead from Busch. On lap 40, Jimmie Johnson and Kyle Busch went down pit road when Carl Edwards went under the yellow line and underneath Johnson and Busch and made no contact with both of the cars and Edwards went back up the track and lost 3 positions. Everyone made it through unscathed and there was no accident. But for some reason with 28 laps to go just 3 laps after Edwards dodged Johnson and Busch, NASCAR black flagged Carl Edwards and said that Edwards passed Johnson and Busch below the yellow line which confused both commentators Bill Weber and Wally Dallenbach Jr. Edwards and his team argued that Edwards was trying to avoid an accident from happening and lost positions. But yet, NASCAR still called Edwards to do a pass through on pit road which Edwards refused to do even saying on his radio "no I'm not doing it! It's wrong!" Edwards' crew chief Bob Osborne calmed Edwards down and told him to do the penalty which Edwards did eventually serve his penalty. With 25 laps to go, Tony Stewart passed Michael Waltrip for the lead. With 23 to go, Jamie McMurray took the lead followed by Dale Earnhardt Jr. and Scott Riggs in the next 2 laps during green flag pit stops. Unfortunately for Carl Edwards, after doing his pass through, Edwards was penalized again for too fast entering pit road. After everything cycled through, Denny Hamlin was the race leader. With 8 laps to go, Kyle Busch attempted to take the lead from Hamlin and beat Hamlin to the line to lead that lap but Denny took it back with 7 to go. With 4 laps to go, Tony Stewart took the lead from Hamlin. Unfortunately for Stewart, the 3rd and final caution of the race flew when Ryan Newman blew a tire down the backstretch and left debris. The race would go into a green-white-checker finish. On the restart, Hamlin took the lead from Stewart and Hamlin held off the pack to surprise everyone and win the Budwiser Shootout. Hamlin became the first rookie to win the Shootout in NASCAR history. Dale Earnhardt Jr., Tony Stewart, Scott Riggs, and Jimmie Johnson rounded out the top 5 while Matt Kenseth, Mark Martin, Jamie McMurray, Joe Nemechek, and Dale Jarrett rounded out the top 10.

Race results

References 

Budweiser Shootout
NASCAR races at Daytona International Speedway
Budweiser Shootout
Budweiser Shootout
NASCAR controversies